Harry Simmons may refer to:

 Harry Simmons (baseball) (1907–1998), American baseball executive, writer and historian; inductee of the Canadian Baseball Hall of Fame
 Harry Simmons (high jumper) (1911–1944), English high jumper
 Harry Simmons (rugby union) (born 1997), English rugby union player
 Harry Simmons (American football) (died 1990), American football and college basketball coach

See also
 Al Simmons (Aloysius Harry Simmons; 1902–1956), American professional baseball player; inductee of the National Baseball Hall of Fame
 Harold Simmons (1931–2013), American businessman, investor, and philanthropist
 Harold Simmons (folklorist) (1914–1966), Saint Lucian folklorist, artist, historian, and social worker
 Henry Simmons (disambiguation), several people